The Australia Act 1986 is the short title of each of a pair of separate but related pieces of legislation: one an Act of the Commonwealth (i.e. federal) Parliament of Australia, the other an Act of the Parliament of the United Kingdom. In Australia they are referred to, respectively, as the Australia Act 1986 (Cth) and the Australia Act 1986 (UK). These nearly identical Acts were passed by the two parliaments, because of uncertainty as to whether the Commonwealth Parliament alone had the ultimate authority to do so. They were enacted using legislative powers conferred by enabling Acts passed by the parliaments of every Australian state. The Acts came into effect simultaneously, on 3 March 1986.

According to the long title of the Australian act, its purpose was "to bring constitutional arrangements affecting the Commonwealth and the States to be brought into conformity with the status of the Commonwealth of Australia as a sovereign, independent and federal nation". The Australia Act (Cth and UK) eliminated the remaining possibilities for the United Kingdom to legislate with effect in Australia, for the UK to be involved in Australian government, and for an appeal from any Australian court to a British court. This act formally severed all legal ties between Australia and the United Kingdom except for the monarchy.

At the time, the Commonwealth, state and UK acts were known as the "Australia Acts". However, the state Acts have performed their function and the expression "Australia Act(s)" is now used to refer only to the Commonwealth and UK Acts.

Background

The Commonwealth of Australia was formed in 1901 by the federation of six British colonies, each of which became a state. The Constitution of Australia provided for a Commonwealth Parliament, with legislative power on a range of specified topics.  Some of these topics are exclusive to the Commonwealth, either expressly or by judicial implication; the others are exercised concurrently by the Commonwealth and the states, a relationship that since Federation the High Court of Australia has tended to interpret to the benefit of the Commonwealth;  while the residue of legislative power is left to the states, although all of the states’ legislative power is to be exercised consistently with Commonwealth legislation in the same field. That constitution was (and still is) contained in a British statute. The United Kingdom Parliament retained ultimate legislative power in relation to Australia.

The UK Parliament's power to legislate with effect for the Commonwealth itself was mostly ended with the Statute of Westminster 1931, when adopted by Australia in 1942 retroactive to 1939. The Statute provided (s 4) that no future UK Act would apply to a Dominion (of which Australia was one) as part of its law unless the Act expressly declared that the Dominion had requested and consented to it. Until then, Australia had legally been a self-governing dominion of the British Empire, but with the adoption of the Statute became a (mostly) sovereign state.

However, s 4 of the Statute only affected UK laws that were to apply as part of Australian Commonwealth law, not UK laws that were to apply as part of the law of any Australian state. Thus, the Parliament of the United Kingdom still had the power to legislate for the states. In practice, however, this power was almost never exercised. For example, in a referendum on secession in Western Australia in April 1933, 68% of voters favoured seceding from Australia and becoming a separate Dominion. The state government sent a delegation to Westminster to request that this result be enacted into law, but the British government refused to intervene on the grounds that this was a matter for the Australian government. As a result of this decision in London, no action was taken in Canberra or Perth.

In the 1980s, Canada, Australia, and New Zealand all began the process of severing their last constitutional links to the United Kingdom. Canada began by patriating its constitution in the Constitution Act, 1982, which was enacted by the British Parliament in the Canada Act 1982. New Zealand experienced a constitutional crisis in 1984, leading to a review of New Zealand's constitution. Australia was experiencing the same desire for constitutional modernisation.

Appeals to the Judicial Committee of the Privy Council 
At federation in 1901, the supreme court of each colony became the supreme court of that state. In 1903, a High Court of Australia was established, one of whose functions was to hear appeals from the state supreme courts. The draft of the Constitution, that was put to voters in the various colonies and presented to the British government for embodiment in UK legislation, was that there was to be no appeal from the High Court to the Judicial Committee of the Privy Council in any matter involving the interpretation of the Constitution or of the constitution of a state, unless it involved the interests of some other dominion. However, the British insisted on a compromise. Section 74 of the Constitution as enacted by the Imperial Parliament provided two possibilities of appeal. There could be an appeal if the High Court issued a certificate that it was appropriate for the Privy Council to determine an inter se matter, i.e. a matter that concerned the constitutional relations between the Commonwealth and one or more states or between two or more states. And there could be an appeal with permission of the Privy Council. The Commonwealth Parliament was empowered to legislate to limit the latter path and it did so in 1968 and 1975; but legislation could only limit, not abolish.

Predictably, the High Court proved reluctant to grant certificates for appeal to the Privy Council. The discretion was exercised only once, in 1912. In 1961, delivering on behalf of the whole Court a brief dismissal of an application for a certificate, Chief Justice Sir Owen Dixon said: "experience showsand that experience was anticipated when s. 74 was enactedthat it is only those who dwell under a Federal Constitution who can become adequately qualified to interpret and apply its provisions". In 1985, the High Court unanimously observed that the power to grant such a certificate "has long since been spent" and is "obsolete".

Although the path of appeal from the High Court to the Privy Council had been effectively blocked, the High Court could not block appeals from state supreme courts directly to the Privy Council. Nor did the Constitution limit, or provide for legislation to limit, such appeals. The expense of any appeal to the Privy Council in London had been a deterrent: in any year, there had never been more than a handful. Nonetheless, by the 1980s the possibility of appeal from a state supreme court was seen as outdated. In addition, in 1978 confusion over the relative precedential value of High Court and Privy Council decisions had been introduced when the High Court ruled that it would no longer be bound by Privy Council decisions.

Australian and British legislation 
Disagreement existed as to whether the Commonwealth Parliament alone had sufficient authority to enact the Australia Act under s 51(xxxviii) of the Constitution, or whether an additional Act of the UK Parliament would be required. To put the legal status of the Australia Act beyond doubt, the Australian and British parliaments would each enact the Australia Act in substantially similar forms.

The plan to revamp both federal and state constitutional arrangements required each state parliament to pass its own enabling legislation. The long title of these state acts (such as the Australia Acts (Request) Act 1985 of New South Wales) was "An Act to enable the constitutional arrangements affecting the Commonwealth and the States to be brought into conformity with the status of the Commonwealth of Australia as a sovereign, independent and federal nation". The body of each state Act set out the state's "request and consent" as to both the Australian and the UK versions of the Australia Act.

The Governor-General of Australia, Sir Ninian Stephen, assented to the Australia Act (Cth) "In the name of Her Majesty" on 4 December 1985. However, Queen Elizabeth II was to visit Australia early in 1986 and, in acknowledgement of Australian sensibilities, it was arranged that she would assent to both versions of the Act and then proclaim them so that they would come into force at the same moment in both countries. She assented to the Australia Act 1986 (UK) on 17 February 1986 and on 24 February proclaimed that it would come into force at 05:00 Greenwich Mean Time (Coordinated Universal Time) on 3 March. Then, visiting Australia, at a ceremony held in Government House, Canberra, on 2 March 1986 the Queen signed a proclamation that the Australia Act (Cth) would come into force at 05:00 GMT on 3 March. Thus, according to both UK law and Australian law, the two versions of the Australia Act would commence simultaneouslythe UK version at 05:00 GMT in the UK and, according to the time difference, the Australian version at 16:00 AEDT in Canberra. The ceremony was presided over by the Australian prime minister, Bob Hawke, to whom the Queen presented the signed copy of the proclamation, along with the assent original of the UK Act.

The Act 

The Australia Act ended all power of the UK Parliament to legislate with effect in Australiathat is, "as part of the law of" the Commonwealth, a state or a territory (s 1). Conversely, no future law of a state would be void for inconsistency with (being "repugnant to") any UK law applying with "paramount force" in Australia; a state (like the Commonwealth) would have power to repeal or amend such an existing UK law so far as it applied to the state (s 3). State laws would no longer be subject to disallowance and reservation by the monarch (s 8)a power that, anomalously, remains for Commonwealth legislation (Constitution ss 59 and 60).

Similarly, the Australia Act removed the power of the British government to be involved in the governing of an Australian state (ss 7 and 10). Specifically, only the state premier could now advise the King on appointment or removal of a state governor. Nonetheless, the King could still exercise any of his powers with respect to the state if he was "personally present" in the state.

Amendment or repeal 
Section 15 of the Australia Act sets out the procedure that the Act or the Statute of Westminster 1931 can be amended or repealed as part of the law of the Commonwealth, of a state or of a territory. Mirroring the procedure of Section 51(xxxviii) of the Constitution of Australia that was used to enact the Australia Act 1986 (Cth), any amendment to these two pieces of legislation requires the Commonwealth Parliament to act at the request or concurrence of all the state parliaments. , neither the Australia Act nor the Statute of Westminster has been amended in this manner.

Appeals 
Section 74 of the Constitution has not been amended, and the Constitution cannot be amended by legislation. Nonetheless, s 11 of the Australia Act goes as far as legislatively possible, to make s 74 a dead letter. Thus, for practical purposes, the Australia Act has eliminated the remaining methods of appeal to the Privy Council.

Legacy

The principal difference between the Commonwealth and UK versions of the Australia Act lies in the reference, appearing in the long title and preamble to the Commonwealth version but not present in the UK version, to Australia as "a sovereign, independent and federal nation". While this might be understood as a declaration of independence, it can also be understood as an acknowledgement that Australia was already independent, leaving open the question of when independence had been attained. There is no earlier declaration or grant of independence.

The High Court in Sue v Hill in 1999 did not rely upon the long title or the preamble, which conventionally do not have force of law. But it decided that the effect of the Australia Act 1986 (Cth) was that, at least from the date when the Act came into operation, Britain had become a "foreign power" within the meaning of Constitution section 44(i), so that a parliamentary candidate who had British nationality was ineligible to be a member of the Commonwealth Parliament. (Several more cases of British citizenship, as well as citizenship of other countries, in the Commonwealth Parliament came to light in the 2017–18 Australian parliamentary eligibility crisis.)

That view was taken in Sue v Hill by three members of the High Court, supported with misgivings by one other member. One of those who did not find it necessary to express an opinion on this point, Justice Michael Kirby, was in a later case to deliver a dissent in which he argued that the Australia Act 1986 (Cth) was invalid. Constitution s 106 guarantees that a state constitution may be altered only in accordance with its own provisions, hence not by the Commonwealth Parliament. However, both versions of the Australia Act contain amendments to the constitutions of Queensland (s 13) and Western Australia (s 14). In Kirby J's view in Marquet (2003), this was inconsistent with Constitution s 106, so that the Australia Act (Cth) was not a valid exercise of Commonwealth legislative power. A majority, however, thought that it was sufficient that the Act had been passed in reliance on Constitution s 51(xxxviii), which gives the Commonwealth Parliament power to legislate at the request of the state parliaments.

In Shaw v Minister for Immigration and Multicultural Affairs (2003), the High Court held that the act "gave voice to the completion of Australia's evolutionary independence ... it was a formal declaration that the Commonwealth of Australia and the Australian states were completely constitutionally independent of the United Kingdom".

See also
 Canada Act 1982; Constitution Act, 1982
 New Zealand Constitution Act 1986

Footnotes

References

Citations

Sources 
 Primary sources

 
 
 
 
 
 
 
 
 
 
 
 
 
 

 Secondary sources

External links
 Privy Council appeals:
 Privy Council Appeals from Australia (up to 1980 only, from AustLII). Retrieved 5 June 2011
 Privy Council Decisions (complete, from BAILII). Retrieved 5 June 2011
 National Archives of Australia, "Documenting a Democracy":
 
 
 Transcript, Media release, 2 March 1986, Prime Miniser Bob Hawke, Proclamation of the Australia Act 1986 (Cth) Retrieved 14 January 2020

1986 in Australian law
Australia and the Commonwealth of Nations
Australian constitutional law
Independence acts in the Parliament of the United Kingdom
Political history of Australia
United Kingdom Acts of Parliament 1986
Acts of the Parliament of the United Kingdom concerning Australia
Acts of the Parliament of Australia
March 1986 events in Australia
United Kingdom and the Commonwealth of Nations